Dar Gel-e Kheyrali (also Romanized as Dār Gel-e Kheyr‘alī; also known as Dār Gel and Dār Gol) is a village in Afrineh Rural District, Mamulan District, Pol-e Dokhtar County, Lorestan Province, Iran. At the 2006 census, its population was 21, in 4 families.

References 

Towns and villages in Pol-e Dokhtar County